Malatesta Baglioni (1581–1648) was a Roman Catholic prelate who served as Bishop of Assisi (1641–1648), Apostolic Nuncio to Emperor (1634–1639), Bishop of Pesaro (1612–1641).

Biography
Malatesta Baglioni was born on 1 Jan 1581 in Perugia, Italy and ordained a priest in Jan 1612.
On 16 Jul 1612, he was appointed during the papacy of Pope Paul V as Bishop of Pesaro.
On 25 Jul 1612, he was consecrated bishop by Pier Paolo Crescenzi, Cardinal-Priest of Santi Nereo ed Achilleo, with Ottavio Accoramboni, Bishop Emeritus of Fossombrone, and Giulio Sansedoni, Bishop Emeritus of Grosseto, serving as co-consecrators.
On 8 Jul 1634, he was appointed during the papacy of Pope Urban VIII as Apostolic Nuncio to Emperor; he resigned from the position on 8 Aug 1639.
On 16 Sep 1641, he was appointed during the papacy of Pope Urban VIII as Bishop of Assisi.
He served as Bishop of Assisi until his death on 11 Feb 1648 in Assisi, Italy.

While bishop, he was the principal consecrator of Franz Wilhelm von Wartenberg, Bishop of Osnabrück (1636); and Anselm Casimir Wambold von Umstadt, Archbishop of Mainz (1636).

References

External links and additional sources
 (for Chronology of Bishops) 
 (for Chronology of Bishops) 
 (for Chronology of Bishops) 
 (for Chronology of Bishops) 
 (for Chronology of Bishops) 

17th-century Italian Roman Catholic bishops
Bishops appointed by Pope Paul V
Bishops appointed by Pope Urban VIII
1581 births
1648 deaths
Apostolic Nuncios to the Holy Roman Empire
People from Perugia